Rebecca Katie Smith (born 17 June 1981) is an international footballer who played for New Zealand.

Smith was a World Cup and Olympic footballer captaining the New Zealand women's national football team, and culminating her club career winning The Triple with VfL Wolfsburg as UEFA Champions League, German League, and German Cup Winners up until her retirement in 2013.

Early life
Smith was born in Los Angeles, California to New Zealand parents and attended high school at Chadwick School in Palos Verdes, California and played soccer there during her first year. She lettered in basketball, waterpolo and softball all years at Chadwick. She graduated in 1999 with the highest honor in her class, The Headmaster's Award.

Football career 

Smith captained NCAA Div 1 Duke University side and graduated with an Economics and Spanish degree before deciding to pursue her football career abroad, landing a professional contract in Germany with then European Champions, FFC Frankfurt.

Smith then played for the Sunnanå SK in Sweden and then Newcastle Jets in the inaugural W-League in Australia, before being signed by VfL Wolfsburg on 2 February 2009. While at VfL Wolfsburg, Smith helped the club win the coveted Treble (Triple), the Frauen-Bundesliga in 2012–2013, the UEFA Women's Champions League in 2012–2013 with a 1–0 win over Lyon in the finals, and the DFB Pokal as well as the Ladies First Cup in 2013 with a 2–0 win over Barcelona in the finals.

In 2013, she ended her career due to knee problems.

International 
Smith made her Football Ferns debut in a 15–0 victory over Samoa on 7 April 2003, and captained New Zealand at the 2007 FIFA Women's World Cup finals in China, where they lost to Brazil 0–5, Denmark (0-2) and China (0-2).

Smith was also included in the New Zealand squad for the 2008 Summer Olympics where they drew with Japan (2-2) before losing to Norway(0-1) and USA (0-4). Smith's solid performances in New Zealand's rearguard earned her a FIFA Women's World Player of the Year nomination in 2007 and New Zealand Player of the Year in 2007. She was also named Oceania's Player of the Year twice in both 2011 and 2013.

Smith played her 50th international in a friendly against Australia on 12 May 2011.

Smith captained New Zealand for the 2011 FIFA Women's World Cup finals in Germany.

Smith again captained the New Zealand team that reached the quarter-finals at the 2012 Summer Olympics.

On 18 September 2013, Smith announced her retirement from football.

International goals

Professional life

FIFA 
When Smith retired from football, she transitioned into working at FIFA, managing their women's competitions.

COPA90 
Smith joined COPA90, in December 2018 as the Global Executive Director of Women's Game for COPA90.

The Players Podcast 
COPA90 launched The Players Podcast, with BBC, which Smith hosts and sits down with some of the biggest players and personalities in the sport and beyond to talk about topics through the lens of football but that go way beyond football.

Honours
Individual
 IFFHS OFC Woman Team of the Decade 2011–2020

References

External links

 
 NZ-Soccer Profile
 Interview *German*
 

1981 births
Living people
American people of New Zealand descent
Damallsvenskan players
Duke Blue Devils women's soccer players
Expatriate women's footballers in Sweden
Expatriate women's soccer players in Australia
Footballers at the 2008 Summer Olympics
Footballers at the 2012 Summer Olympics
Newcastle Jets FC (A-League Women) players
New Zealand expatriate women's association footballers
New Zealand expatriate sportspeople in Australia
New Zealand expatriate sportspeople in Germany
New Zealand expatriate sportspeople in Sweden
New Zealand women's international footballers
New Zealand women's association footballers
Olympic association footballers of New Zealand
Soccer players from Los Angeles
Sunnanå SK players
VfL Wolfsburg (women) players
Women's association football defenders
1. FFC Frankfurt players
2007 FIFA Women's World Cup players
2011 FIFA Women's World Cup players
Ajax America Women players
American expatriate soccer players in Germany
American expatriate sportspeople in Sweden
American expatriate sportspeople in Australia
American expatriate women's soccer players